This is a list of newspapers in Vanuatu.

L'Hebdo du Vanuatu
Nasara
Ni-Vanuatu
Pentecost Star
Port Vila Presse
Vanuatu Daily Post
The Vanuatu Independent
Vanuatu Times
Vanuatu Weekly

See also
Media of Vanuatu
List of newspapers

References

Vanuatu

Newspapers